Farah Alibay is a Canadian systems engineer at the NASA Jet Propulsion Laboratory who has worked on the InSight, Mars Cube One, and Mars 2020 missions.

Early life and education 
The daughter of immigrants from Madagascar, Alibay was born in Montréal, Quebec. She grew up in nearby Joliette, Quebec, and moved with her family to Manchester, England for high school. French is her native language. The journey by the Canadian astronaut Julie Payette to space inspired Alibay in middle school; as Payette was from her province, she served as a role model. She went to the University of Cambridge, where she received her bachelor's and master's degrees in aerospace and aerothermal engineering in 2010.

She earned her PhD in aeronautics and astronautics engineering from the Massachusetts Institute of Technology (MIT) in 2014. Her PhD research with advisor Dr. Jeffrey Hoffman focused on the use of spatially and temporally distributed multi-vehicle systems for the exploration of planetary bodies in the solar system.

In 2013, Alibay was awarded the AeroAstro Graduate Teaching Assistantship Award at MIT for her outstanding work as a teaching assistant in implementing Concurrent Design Facility software into the curriculum.

Career 
After her master's degree, Alibay participated in the NASA Academy internship at Goddard Space Flight Center through which she was introduced to the many NASA centres and activities. It was there that she discovered her passion for robotic planetary exploration. She interned at NASA's Jet Propulsion Laboratory while she worked on her PhD.

Following graduation in 2014, Alibay came to the Jet Propulsion Laboratory full-time. She started as the systems engineer of the Mars Cube One CubeSats mission, a companion mission to InSight.In 2016, she became a Payload Systems Engineer on the InSight mission, a robotic lander spacecraft that was designed to study the interior of the planet Mars, to where it lifted off on May 5, 2018. Before the launch, Alibay had been  responsible for the proper integration and testing of all of the spacecrat's instruments. While the mission waited for the spacecraft to land on the surface of Mars, Alibay helped the teams prepare for operations, and she tested the detector equipment. To celebrate the landing on Mars on November 26, 2018, she had her hair dyed red to match the clour of Mars and of the InSight logo.
In 2019, Dr. Alibay joined the Mars 2020 mobility team. Her duty was to ensure that the rover did not get lost on Mars. During surface operations after the February 18, 2021 landing, she was the Tactical Integration Lead and an interface between the Perseverance rover and Ingenuity. On April 19, 2021, Alibay was part of the Jet Propulsion Laboratory team that successfully made Ingenuity, the first powered-controlled aircraft to fly on another planet.

She works on diversity and inclusion in STEM, both to increase them in her work environment and to prevent others from facing the challenges that she had as an LGBTQ+ immigrant woman of colour.

Personal life
Alibay has spoken to the value of good mentors when she was an intern, and she mentors women interns as a result of those positive experiences. She indicated that a guidance counselor had once attempted to dissuade her from engineering since it is a male-dominated career.

Her favourite moon is Saturn's Enceladus. She enjoys outdoor activities like hiking, camping, biking, and skiing, and also weight-lifting. She is also a Big Sister as part of the Big Brothers Big Sisters of America program.

References

External links 

 NASA Biography of Farah Alibay (2018)
 NASA Biography of Farah Alibay (2020) 
 

Year of birth missing (living people)
Living people
Jet Propulsion Laboratory faculty
Scientists from Montreal
Alumni of the University of Cambridge
MIT School of Engineering alumni
21st-century women engineers
Planetary scientists
Massachusetts Institute of Technology alumni
NASA people
American aerospace engineers
American women engineers
LGBT women
Canadian LGBT scientists
British LGBT scientists
21st-century American women
Canadian LGBT academics
21st-century Canadian LGBT people